Launoy can mean:
 Launoy, Aisne, commune in the Aisne department, France
 People:
 Jean de Launoy (1603-1678), a French historian
 Christian de Launoy, a French naturalist, alive in 1783